April Captains is a 2000 film telling the story of the Carnation Revolution, the military coup that overthrew the corporatist dictatorship (known as the Estado Novo) in Portugal on 25 April 1974. Although dramatised, the plot is closely based on the events of the revolution and many of the key characters are real - such as Captain Salgueiro Maia and Prime Minister Marcelo Caetano.

This European co-production was directed by Maria de Medeiros. It was screened in the Un Certain Regard section at the 2000 Cannes Film Festival.

Plot
The film opens on the evening of 24 April 1974, as a young conscript soldier (Daniel) kisses farewell to his girlfriend (Rosa) before boarding a train from Lisbon back to his Army base at Santarém. Both are fearful that he will be sent to fight in the Portuguese Colonial War. Late and depressed, Rosa then travels by tram to Antónia's flat to babysit for her daughter Amelia. On arriving back (late) at his base, Daniel is oblivious to the imminent coup. Captain Salgueiro Maia arrests the base commander at gunpoint and orders the soldiers to assemble on parade in the middle of the night; he asks them to come with him to Lisbon to overthrow the government. Maia's erudite but cynical and cautious colleague Major Gervasio refuses to take part, as does Lieutenant Lobão.

Meanwhile, in Lisbon, left-wing journalist/lecturer Antónia is having a row with her estranged husband Manuel, a Portuguese Army captain, over atrocities he has been involved with during the Colonial War. Rosa having arrived to babysit, Antónia then goes to a formal reception where she pleads with her brother (Filipe Correia), a minister in the government, to release one of her students who had been arrested by the DGS (secret police). Filipe refuses to help and returns to his conversation with Brigadier Pais. The head of the DGS (Salieri) is also present at the reception; he recognises Antónia and subsequently assaults her in a toilet. Antónia returns home in despair, not realizing that her estranged husband Manuel is also a coup plotter. Manuel and his colleague prepare to seize control of the Rádio Clube Português, a radio station, from which communiques on behalf of the Armed Forces Movement will be broadcast.

Meanwhile, simultaneously, Maia and his troops are preparing to set off for Lisbon, and the other coup plotters are also preparing to move into position. The signal for the coup to start is the playing of Grandola, Vila Morena on the radio shortly after midnight on 25 April. Maia's troops set off in a column of armoured vehicles. Manuel, Fonseca, Botelho and Silva capture the Rádio Clube Português in Lisbon. A signal is given by morse code by car headlights to prisoners being held in prison by the DGS. Maia's armoured column has to stop in open countryside due to a breakdown by one of the key armoured vehicles; at this point Major Gervásio arrives in a conspicuous red sports car and joins the rebels. Maia's troops arrive in the Praça do Comércio in Lisbon, but are threatened by a naval warship and by a column of tanks commanded by Brigadier Pais (who remains loyal to the regime). Following a stand-off, with Labão and Maia both threatened with being shot, many of Pais' troops defect to the rebels. On entering the Government offices in the Praca do Comercio, Maia discovers that the ministers have fled to the GNR headquarters at Carmo in Lisbon. There are several asides, including where the young conscript soldier in the opening scenes of the film meets Rosa again, placing a carnation in the barrel of his rifle (and are later discovered inside a military armoured car whilst making love).

At the GNR barracks, a further stand-off ensues, with the regime leaders (including Marcelo Caetano) trapped inside. Also trapped in their nearby headquarters, a group of DGS officers open fire from the windows at the crowd in the street outside, killing four - the only fatalities of the Carnation Revolution. Virgílio is one of the casualties. Maia eventually ordering his troops to shoot at the building with machine-gun fire. Following this atrocity, Maia threatens to blow up the building with artillery.

Shortly before Maia's deadline expires, emissaries from General António de Spínola arrive, to negotiate the surrender of the regime's leaders. Spinola himself arrives, places Gervásio in local command (despite having spent almost the entire day avoiding any action) and orders Maia to convey the arrested Caetano, Correira and the other leaders to an air force base, from whence they are flown to Madeira and then on to exile in Brazil. The film closes with the release of the political prisoners, including Antónia's lover (Emílio), and Manuel and Maia narrowly avoid being attacked by a crowd when they are mistaken for DGS/PIDE officers rather than soldiers.

It is then revealed that Antónia and Emílio will both go into politics, she on the left but he ultimately on the centre-right; after two years together they separate. Manuel will drift into alcoholism and Maia was to die from cancer in his late 40s. Nevertheless, the revolution leads to the downfall of the Estado Novo regime and its replacement by democracy and the rule of law for Portugal.

Cast

References

External links

2000s historical drama films
Cold War films
Films set in 1974
Films set in Portugal
Films directed by Maria de Medeiros
Portuguese historical drama films
Golden Globes (Portugal) winners
2000s Portuguese-language films
Films shot in Portugal
Films about coups d'état
2000s French films
2000s Spanish films
2000s Italian films